Ernie Toseland (17 March 1905 – 19 October 1987) was an English footballer who played in the outside right position. He has been described as 'a flying winger – football's Jesse Owens'.

Early life
Toseland was born in Northampton in 1905. Be began his career as a footballer playing for Higham Ferrers Town and then Northampton Town and Queens Park Rangers.

Manchester City
In 1928 he turned professional by signing for Manchester City who were then in the First Division. He was part of the City team until 1938 and appeared 368 times, scoring 61 goals in the process. Toseland joined a strong forward line at City which included England internationals such as outside left Eric Brook, inside forward Tommy Johnson and centre forward Fred Tilson. The City team also included the England international centre half Sam Cowan and Scotland captain Jimmy McMullan.Toseland's first goal for City was scored in a 3–0 victory over Aston Villa in the 1928–1929 football season. Eric Brook and Tommy Johnson scored the other goals. That season City finished eighth and Tommy Johnson scored a club record of 38 league goals.

In the 1929–1930 season Manchester City finished third in the first division, three points behind runners up Derby County. Toseland scored three goals in the FA Cup that season but Manchester City were knocked out by Hull City in the fifth round. In the 1930–1931 season, City finished eighth in the league and Toseland scored ten league goals for the club. Eric Brook was the team's leading goalscorer that season with 16 goals. In the 1931–1932 season the City team, which now included the Scottish centre forward Alec Herd, managed to reach the semi final of the FA Cup but were defeated by Arsenal by 1–0 with a goal from England international Cliff Bastin. In the following season, Toseland helped City reach the final. In the 1933 FA Cup Final he was part of the Manchester City team that was defeated three goals to nil by Everton who were captained by England international Dixie Dean. The Everton team also included former City player Tommy Johnson. In the 1934 FA Cup Final Toseland was part of the City team which beat Portsmouth 2–1. Toseland had scored once in a 6–1 demolition of Aston Villa in the semi final of that year's competition. The other goals were scored by Alec Herd and Fred Tilson (who scored four).

In the 1934–1935 football season Toseland scored five goals and City finished fourth in the league, ten points behind champions Arsenal. One of Toseland's five goals that season came in a memorable 5–0 victory against Wolverhampton Wanderers on the final day of the season. In the 1936–1936 season, Toseland was again City's fourth highest scorer in the league with ten goals. Eric Brook was the leading scorer with thirteen goals. In the 1936–1937 football season Toseland was part of the first Manchester City side to win the League Championship. The team went on an unbeaten run after Christmas, winning 14 times and drawing 6 games. The championship was won at Maine Road with a 4–1 victory over Sheffield Wednesday. In the 1937–1938 football season Toseland was part of the City team that were relegated from the first division despite scoring more goals than any other team. In 1938 he transferred to Sheffield Wednesday but only played fifteen times for his new team before the outbreak of war.

Retirement
Toseland continued to play amateur football after the war, signing for Mossley at the age of 41 and scored 12 goals in 49 appearances in the 1946–47 season, before retiring at the end of the season. He died in Stockport on 19 October 1987.

Honours

As a player

Manchester City
 FA Cup winners: 1934
 Football League First Division champions: 1936–37

References

Manchester City F.C. players
English footballers
1905 births
1987 deaths
Association football wingers
English Football League players
English Football League representative players
Sheffield Wednesday F.C. players
Northampton Town F.C. players
Queens Park Rangers F.C. players
Mossley A.F.C. players
FA Cup Final players